Raintown is an unincorporated community in Pocahontas County, West Virginia, United States.

The community was named after John Raine, a businessperson in the lumber industry.

References

Unincorporated communities in Pocahontas County, West Virginia
Unincorporated communities in West Virginia